Ernest Raymond Concannon (January 12, 1909 – June 1986) was an American football offensive lineman in the National Football League for the Boston Redskins.  He attended New York University.

1909 births
1986 deaths
American football offensive guards
Boston Redskins players
Sportspeople from Waltham, Massachusetts